Matthijs (also Mattijs, Mathijs and Matijs) is a Dutch form of the masculine given name "Matthew". It can also be a surname. Notable people with the name include:

Given name
Matthijs/Matthys
 Matthijs Accama (1702–1783), Dutch painter
 Matthijs Balen (1684–1766), Dutch painter
 Matthijs van den Bergh (1618–1687), Dutch painter
 Matthijs van den Bos (born 1969), Dutch academic
 Mattijs Branderhorst (born 1993), Dutch footballer
 Matthijs Bril (1550–1583), Flemish painter
 Matthijs Brouwer (born 1980), Dutch field hockey player
 Matthijs Büchli (born 1992), Dutch track cyclist
 Matthijs Clavan (1929–1983), Dutch footballer
 Matthijs Cock (c.1505–1548), Flemish landscape painter and draughtsman
 Matthijs van Dulcken (c.1560s–1634), Dutch mayor and governor
 Matthijs Harings (1593–1667), Dutch painter
 Matthijs van Heijningen (born 1944), Dutch film producer
 Matthijs van Heijningen, Jr. (born 1965), Dutch filmmaker
 Matthijs Huizing (born 1960), Dutch politician
 O. J. Matthijs Jolles (1911–1968) American translator from German
 Matthijs Kleyn (born 1979), Dutch television presenter
 Matthijs Langhedul (died circa 1636), Flemish organ builder
 Matthijs de Ligt (born 1999), Dutch footballer
 Matthijs Maris (1839–1917), Dutch painter
 Matthijs van Miltenburg (born 1972), Dutch politician
 Matthijs Musson (1598–1678), Dutch painter
 Matthijs Naiveu (1647–1726), Dutch painter
 Matthijs van Nieuwkerk (born 1960), Dutch television presenter
 Matthijs Pool (1676–1732), Dutch engraver
 Matthijs Quast (died 1641), Dutch explorer
 Matthijs Röling (born 1943), Dutch painter
 Matthijs van de Sande Bakhuyzen (born 1988), Dutch actor
 Matthijs van Schelven (born 1989), Dutch cricket player
 Matthijs Siegenbeek (1774–1854), Dutch academic
 Matthijs Vellenga (born 1977), Dutch rower
 Matthijs Vermeulen (1888–1967), Dutch composer and music journalist
 Matthijs Verschoor (born 1955), Dutch pianist
 Matthijs Wulfraet (1648–1727), Dutch painter

Mathijs
 Mathijs Bouman (born 1966), Dutch economist and journalist
 Mathijs Heyligers (born 1957), Dutch violin maker 

Mattijs
 Mattijs Branderhorst (born 1993), Dutch footballer
 Mattijs Visser (born 1958), Dutch organiser of art exhibitions and performances

Matijs
Matijs Dierickx (born 1991), Belgian badminton player

Surname
Matthijs
 Abraham Matthijs (1581–1649), Flemish painter
 Paul Matthijs (born 1976), Dutch football player
 Rudy Matthijs (born 1959), Belgian road bicycle racer

Mathijs
 Ernest Mathijs (born c.1968), Canadian film professor

See also
 Mathies
 Mattheus
 Matthias
 Matthew (name)
 Matthys (as a surname)

Dutch masculine given names
Dutch-language surnames
Patronymic surnames